Winston Greenidge (born 15 March 1929) was a Barbadian cricketer. He played in six first-class matches for the Barbados cricket team from 1951 to 1961.

See also
 List of Barbadian representative cricketers

References

External links
 

1929 births
Possibly living people
Barbadian cricketers
Barbados cricketers
People from Saint Michael, Barbados